Malcolm X Park (formerly named Black Oak Park) is an urban park in West Philadelphia named in honor of Malcolm X.  It is a six-acre park located around 51st Street and Pine Street.  The park is known for its jazz festival during the summer.

See also
List of parks in Philadelphia

References

Municipal parks in Philadelphia
West Philadelphia